Meo (and its variants Méo, de Meo and diMeo) is a surname. Notable people with the surname include:

Antonia De Meo, American lawyer and diplomat
Antoine Méo (born 1984), French enduro rider
Antonietta Meo (1930–1937), Italian Roman Catholic child venerable
Gaetano Meo (1849–1925), Italian-British landscape painter.
George de Meo, Italian-American arms dealer
Giancarlo Meo, Italian record producer and entrepreneur
Giulio Di Meo (born 1982), Italian tennis player
Luca de Meo (born 1967), Italian business manager
Paul De Meo (1953–2018), American screenwriter and film producer
Paul DiMeo (born 1958), American television personality, and building designer
Pip Meo (born 1984), New Zealand football player 
Rosanne Meo (born 1945/1946), New Zealand businesswoman
Roy DeMeo (1940–1983), Italian-American mobster
Steven Meo, Welsh television actor 
Tony Meo (born 1959), English snooker player
William DeMeo, American actor

Surnames of English origin
Surnames of Italian origin